Stephen Self (born May 9, 1950) is a Canadian retired ice hockey forward who played three games for the Washington Capitals during the 1976–77 NHL season.

External links

1950 births
Living people
Canadian ice hockey forwards
Greensboro Generals (EHL) players
Greensboro Generals (SHL) players
Sportspeople from Peterborough, Ontario
Undrafted National Hockey League players
Washington Capitals players